Elizabeth Toomey (born 1951) is a New Zealand law academic. She is currently a full professor at the University of Canterbury.

Education 
Toomey completed her undergraduate studies at the University of Otago, followed by an LLM at the University of Canterbury.

Career 
Toomey joined the faculty at University of Canterbury.
Toomey's research interests include real property / real estate, several aspects related to the 2010 Canterbury earthquake and commercial law. She is a member of the Legal Aid Review Panel. Along with Jeremy Finn she got funding from the New Zealand Law Foundation to study the legal implications of disasters, which resulted in a book  'Legal Response to Natural Disasters'  and select committee submissions.

Selected works
 Toomey, Elizabeth. "The slow road to recovery: a city rebuilds under the Canterbury Earthquake Recovery Act 2011." In Asia-Pacific Disaster Management, pp. 217–243. Springer, Berlin, Heidelberg, 2014.
 Taylor, Lynne, Ursula Cheer, Debra Wilson, Elizabeth Toomey, and Sascha Mueller. "Improving the Effectiveness of Large Class Teaching in Law Degrees." New Zealand Law Review 2013, no. 1 (2013): 100–135.
 Toomey, Elizabeth. "The recovery phase in post-earthquake Christchurch, New Zealand." In Community-Based Reconstruction of Society, pp. 23–30. Springer, Singapore, 2017.
 Toomey, Elizabeth. "Trans-Tasman Sporting Leagues: Governance and Integration." Canterbury L. Rev. 18 (2012): 63.
 Toomey, Elizabeth. "Public participation in resource management: The New Zealand experience." NZJ Envtl. L. 16 (2012): 117.

References

External links
 
 
 institutional homepage

New Zealand women academics
20th-century New Zealand lawyers
New Zealand women lawyers
Academic staff of the University of Canterbury
University of Canterbury alumni
University of Otago alumni
1951 births
Living people
21st-century New Zealand lawyers